The Weifang Cup (Simplified Chinese: 潍坊杯) is a football tournament which traditionally features invited national and club teams composed of under-20 players although the first tournament in 2006 included under-13 and under-15 teams as well. The tournament is held by the China Football Association and Shandong Luneng Taishan F.C. every summer in the city of Weifang, China.

In 2012 this tournament expanded to 12 teams.

Winners
{| class="wikitable" style="text-align: center; box-shadow: 4px 4px 4px #CCC; "
|- 
! colspan=2|Year
! Winner
! score
! Runners-up
|-
| rowspan=2|2006
| U-15
| align=right| Shandong Luneng 
| 1
| align=left |  Bayern Munich
|- 
| U-13
| align=right| Shandong Luneng 
| 4–0
| align=left |  Beijing Team
|-
| colspan=2|2007
| align=right| 
| 1
| align=left | 
|-
| colspan=2|2008 || colspan=3| 
|-
| colspan=2|2009
| align=right| Espanyol 
| 1–0
| align=left | 
|-
| colspan=2|2010
| align=right| 
| 3–1
| align=left |  Tianjin Teda
|-
| colspan=2|2011
| align=right| Guadalajara 
| 3–1
| align=left | 
|-
| colspan=2|2012
| align=right| Villarreal 
| 1–0
| align=left | 
|-
| colspan=2|2013
| align=right| São Paulo 
| 4–0
| align=left |  Shandong Luneng
|-
| colspan=2|2014
| align=right| River Plate 
| 1–0
| align=left |  Shandong Luneng
|-
| rowspan=2|2015
| Men
| align=right| Wolfsburg 
| 1–0
| align=left |  Guadalajara
|- 
| Women
| align=right| 
| 1
| align=left | 
|-
| rowspan=2|2016
| Men
| align=right| Desportivo Brasil 
| 4–1
| align=left | 
|- 
| Women
| align=right| 
| 1
| align=left | 
|-
| rowspan=2|2017
| Men
| align=right| Wolfsburg 
| 4–0
| align=left |  Desportivo Brasil
|- 
| Women
| align=right| 
| 1
| align=left | 
|-
|}

2013 Weifang Cup

Teams

Group A
 HK Rangers
 Botafogo
 Myanmar Youth
 China Youth
  
Group B
 North Korea Youth
 Iran Youth
 São Paulo
 Chivas Guadalajara
   
Group C
 Bahrain Youth
 Mongolia Youth
 Shandong Luneng
 Porto

External links
Weifang Cup - Official Site

References

Shandong Taishan F.C.